Käru is a village in Väike-Maarja Parish, Lääne-Viru County, in northeastern Estonia.

Politician and entrepreneur Juhan Kukk (1885–1942) and former archbishop Kuno Pajula (1924–2012) were born in Käru.

References

 

Villages in Lääne-Viru County
Kreis Wierland